"Polythene Pam" is a song by the English rock band the Beatles from their 1969 album Abbey Road. Written by John Lennon and credited to Lennon–McCartney, it is the fourth song of the album's climactic side-two medley. The Beatles recorded the track in July 1969 as a continuous piece with "She Came In Through the Bathroom Window", which follows it in the medley.

Background and composition
Lennon wrote "Polythene Pam" during the Beatles' 1968 stay in India. While not formally recorded during the sessions for The Beatles (also known as "the White Album"), the song was recorded as a demo at George Harrison's Kinfauns home before the sessions. The demo was later released on Anthology 3 and the 2018 super-deluxe edition of The Beatles. Lennon dismissed the song, along with "Mean Mr. Mustard", in The Beatles Anthology as "a bit of crap I wrote in India".

In 1980, Lennon said about "Polythene Pam": "That was me, remembering a little event with a woman in Jersey, and a man who was England's answer to Allen Ginsberg ... I met him when we were on tour and he took me back to his apartment and I had a girl and he had one he wanted me to meet. He said she dressed up in polythene, which she did. She didn't wear jack boots and kilts, I just sort of elaborated. Perverted sex in a polythene bag. Just looking for something to write about." "England's answer to Allen Ginsberg" refers to Royston Ellis, an English writer whom Lennon knew from when the Beatles played at the Cavern Club. He also described the inspiration for the song as a "mythical Liverpool scrubber dressed in her jackboots and kilt". The song is sung in a very strong Liverpudlian "Scouse" accent.

Polythene is the British variant of the word polyethylene, a plastic material. The name "Polythene Pam" came from the nickname of an early Beatles fan from the Cavern Club days, named Pat Hodgett (now Dawson), who would often eat polythene. She became known as "Polythene Pat". She said in an interview, "I used to eat polythene all the time. I'd tie it in knots and then eat it. Sometimes I even used to burn it and then eat it when it got cold."

Placement on Abbey Road
On the album Abbey Road, the song is linked with the previous song "Mean Mr. Mustard" musically, as the two run together without pause. The two songs are also linked narratively, since "Mean Mr. Mustard" mentions that the title character Mustard has a sister named Pam. The line beginning "His sister Pam" in the song was originally "His sister Shirley", but Lennon changed it to contribute to the continuity of the Abbey Road side two medley. The song "Her Majesty" was originally set between "Mean Mr. Mustard" and "Polythene Pam". "Polythene Pam" then segues into the following song, "She Came In Through the Bathroom Window".

The Beatles recorded the basic track for "Polythene Pam" and "She Came in Through the Bathroom Window" at EMI Studios in London on 25 July. The line-up was Lennon on acoustic 12-string guitar, Harrison on lead guitar, Paul McCartney on bass, and Ringo Starr on drums. Lennon sang an off-mike guide vocal on his song, while McCartney did the same on "She Came in Through the Bathroom Window". During the guitar solo on "Polythene Pam", Lennon shouted out words of encouragement ("Fab! That's great! Real good, that. Real good ..."), some of which appears on the finished recording. In his description of the song, author Ian MacDonald likens Lennon's "massive" opening acoustic guitar chords to the Who's "Pinball Wizard", which was a single at the time.

The band carried out overdubs on the track on 28 July, although many of these contributions, such as piano and electric piano, were subsequently cut. Recording was completed on 30 July, when the final vocal, guitar and percussion overdubs were taped. These included a second lead guitar part by Harrison, playing the descending notes (accompanying Lennon's spoken "Listen to that now. Oh, look out! Here she...") into the start of "She Came in Through the Bathroom Window".

Personnel
According to Walter Everett, except where noted:

 John Lennon – lead vocal, twelve-string acoustic guitar
 Paul McCartney – backing vocal, bass guitar
 George Harrison – backing vocal, lead guitars
 Ringo Starr – drums
 uncredited – tambourine, maracas, cowbell, "whipcrack" percussion

Notable cover versions
Booker T. & the MGs covered the track on their 1970 album McLemore Avenue.
In 1976, Roy Wood of Electric Light Orchestra recorded the song for the musical documentary All This and World War II.
In 1999, Atom and His Package covered the song on the album Making Love (with altered lyrics) as "P.P. (Doo-Doo)".
When Mojo released Abbey Road Now! in 2009, as part of the magazine's series of CDs of Beatles albums covered track-by-track by modern artists, "Polythene Pam" was covered by Cornershop alongside "Mean Mr. Mustard".

Notes

External links
 What Goes On?

The Beatles songs
1969 songs
Songs about fictional female characters
Song recordings produced by George Martin
Songs written by Lennon–McCartney
Songs published by Northern Songs